The Zinagizado is an electrochemical process to provide a ferrous metal material with anti-corrosive properties. It involves the application of a constant electric current through a circuit to break the bonds and these are attached to the metal to be coated by forming a surface coating. The alloy used is called Zinag (Zn-Al-Ag); this alloy has excellent mechanical and corrosive properties, so the piece will have increased by 60% of  life.

The deposition of Zinag provides environmental protection against corrosion and can be used in covering all kinds of steel metallic materials in contact with a corrosive medium. The anti-corrosive property has been obtained by the corrosion resistance of zinc achieved by the aluminium and silver addition, which is cathodically respect to the iron and steel. Cathodic protection

This process is an innovation by Said Robles Casolco and Adrianni Zanatta.

Patent called: Zinagizado as corrosion process for metals by electrolytic method. No. MX/a/2010/009200, IMPI-Mexico.

References

Further reading

Zinc alloys
Aluminium compounds
Silver compounds
Materials science